George F. Ulrich (June 5, 1869 – January 19, 1918) was a Major League Baseball outfielder who played for three seasons. He played for the Washington Senators in 1892, the Cincinnati Reds in 1893, and the New York Giants in 1896.

External links
, or Retrosheet
 

1869 births
1918 deaths
Major League Baseball outfielders
Cincinnati Reds players
Baseball players from Philadelphia
New York Giants (NL) players
Washington Senators (1891–1899) players
19th-century baseball players
Birmingham Grays players
Philadelphia Athletics (minor league) players
Birmingham Blues players
Pensacola (minor league baseball) players
Wilkes-Barre Coal Barons players
York White Roses players
Omaha Omahogs players
Kansas City Cowboys (minor league) players
Denver (minor league baseball) players
Quincy Browns players
Quincy Ravens players
Quincy Bluebirds players
Cedar Rapids Bunnies players
Syracuse Stars (minor league baseball) players
Paterson Silk Weavers players
Toronto Canucks players
Richmond Giants players
Lancaster Maroons players
Reading Coal Heavers players
Allentown Peanuts players
Manchester Manchesters players